Helsby is a village and a civil parish in Cheshire West and Chester, England.  The A56 road passes through it in a north–south direction.  To the east is the former Helsby hill fort and to the west are the Manchester Ship Canal and the River Mersey.  Helsby contains 13 buildings that are recorded in the National Heritage List for England as designated listed buildings, all of which are at Grade II.  This grade is the lowest of the three gradings given to listed buildings and is applied to "buildings of national importance and special interest".

See also
Listed buildings in Alvanley
Listed buildings in Dunham-on-the-Hill
Listed buildings in Elton
Listed buildings in Frodsham
Listed buildings in Hapsford
Listed buildings in Ince

References
Citations

Sources

Listed buildings in Cheshire West and Chester
Lists of listed buildings in Cheshire